Alseis is a genus of flowering plants in the family Rubiaceae. It was described by Heinrich Wilhelm Schott in 1827. The genus is native to tropical Latin America from southern Mexico to Brazil.

Species 

 Alseis blackiana Hemsl. - Panamá, Colombia
 Alseis costaricensis C.M.Taylor - Costa Rica
 Alseis eggersii Standl. - Ecuador, Perú
 Alseis floribunda Schott - Bolivia, Brazil
 Alseis gardneri Wernham - Rio de Janeiro (state)
 Alseis hondurensis Standl. - Chiapas, Guatemala, Belize, Honduras
 Alseis involuta K.Schum. - Brazil
 Alseis labatioides H.Karst. ex K.Schum. - Colombia, Venezuela, Guyana
 Alseis latifolia Gleason - Maranhão
 Alseis longifolia Ducke - Guyana, Suriname, Brazil
 Alseis lugonis L.Andersson - Ecuador
 Alseis microcarpa Standl. & Steyerm. - Venezuela, Colombia, Perú
 Alseis mutisii Moldenke - Colombia, Venezuela
 Alseis peruviana Standl. - Ecuador, Peru
 Alseis pickelii Pilg. & Schmale - Brazil
Alseis reticulata Pilg. & Schmale - Amazonas (state of Brazil) and Bolivia
 Alseis smithii Standl. - Guyana
 Alseis yucatanensis Standl. - Belize, Guatemala, Campeche, Quintana Roo, Tabasco, Chiapas, Yucatán

References

External links 
 Alseis in the World Checklist of Rubiaceae

Rubiaceae genera
Dialypetalantheae
Flora of Central America
Flora of South America
Taxonomy articles created by Polbot